José Benedito Simão (1 January 1951 – 27 November 2015) was a Roman Catholic bishop.

Ordained to the priesthood in 1981, Simão was named auxiliary bishop of the Roman Catholic Archdiocese of São Paulo, Brazil in 2001. In 2009, he was named bishop of the Roman Catholic Diocese of Assis, Brazil and died while still in office.

Notes

1951 births
2015 deaths
21st-century Roman Catholic bishops in Brazil
Roman Catholic bishops of São Paulo
Roman Catholic bishops of Assis